Similosodus castaneus is a species of beetle in the family Cerambycidae. It was described by Per Olof Christopher Aurivillius in 1911, originally under the genus Sodus. It is known from Borneo and Malaysia.

References

castaneus
Beetles described in 1911